Uchuck Lake is a  lake located on Vancouver Island north west of head of Uchucklesit Inlet on the north side of lower Alberni Inlet.

References

Alberni Valley
Lakes of Vancouver Island
Clayoquot Land District